Union Athlétique Valettoise is a French association football club founded in 1948. They are based in the commune of La Valette-du-Var and their home stadium is the Stade Vallis Laeta, which has a capacity of 2,500 spectators. As of the 2009–10 season, the club play in the Championnat de France amateur 2 Group E.

External links
UA Valettoise official website 

Association football clubs established in 1948
1948 establishments in France
Sport in Var (department)
Football clubs in Provence-Alpes-Côte d'Azur